In theoretical computer science, a Markov algorithm is a string rewriting system that uses grammar-like rules to operate on strings of symbols. Markov algorithms have been shown to be Turing-complete, which means that they are suitable as a general model of computation and can represent any mathematical expression from its simple notation. Markov algorithms are named after the Soviet mathematician Andrey Markov, Jr.

Refal is a programming language based on Markov algorithms.

Description

Normal algorithms are verbal, that is, intended to be applied to strings in different alphabets.

The definition of any normal algorithm consists of two parts: the definition of the alphabet of the algorithm (the algorithm will be applied to strings of these alphabet symbols), and the definition of its scheme. The scheme of a normal algorithm is a finite ordered set of so-called substitution formulas, each of which can be simple or final. This assumes that the auxiliary characters  and  do not belong to the alphabet of the algorithm (otherwise two other characters to perform their role as the dividers of the left and right sides, which are not in the algorithm's alphabet, should be selected).

Here is an example of a normal algorithm scheme in the five-letter alphabet :

 

The process of applying the normal algorithm to an arbitrary string  in the alphabet of this algorithm is a discrete sequence of elementary steps, consisting of the following. Let’s assume that  is the word obtained in the previous step of the algorithm (or the original word , if the current step is the first). Then the algorithm terminates and the result of its work is considered to be . However, if this substitution formula is of the form , then out of all of the possible representations of the string  of the form of  the one with the shortest  is chosen, after which the string  is considered to be the result of the current step, subject to further processing in the next step.

For other examples, see below.

Any normal algorithm is equivalent to some Turing machine, and vice versaany Turing machine is equivalent to some normal algorithm. A version of the Church-Turing thesis formulated in relation to the normal algorithm is called the "principle of normalization."

Normal algorithms have proved to be a convenient means for the construction of many sections of constructive mathematics. Moreover, inherent in the definition of a normal algorithm are a number of ideas used in programming languages aimed at handling symbolic informationfor example, in Refal.

Algorithm

The Rules are a sequence of pairs of strings, usually presented in the form of pattern → replacement. Each rule may be either ordinary or terminating.

Given an input string: 

Check the Rules in order from top to bottom to see whether any of the patterns can be found in the input string.
If none is found, the algorithm stops.
If one (or more) is found, use the first of them to replace the leftmost occurrence of matched text in the input string with its replacement.
If the rule just applied was a terminating one, the algorithm stops.
Go to step 1.

Note that after each rule application the search starts over from the first rule.

Example
The following example shows the basic operation of a Markov algorithm.

Rules
"A" -> "apple"
"B" -> "bag"
"S" -> "shop"
"T" -> "the"
"the shop" -> "my brother"
"a never used" -> ."terminating rule"

Symbol string
"I bought a B of As from T S."

Execution
If the algorithm is applied to the above example, the Symbol string will change in the following manner.

"I bought a B of As from T S."
"I bought a B of apples from T S."
"I bought a bag of apples from T S."
"I bought a bag of apples from T shop."
"I bought a bag of apples from the shop."
"I bought a bag of apples from my brother."

The algorithm will then terminate.

Another example

These rules give a more interesting example. They rewrite binary numbers to their unary counterparts. For example, 101 will be rewritten to a string of 5 consecutive bars.

Rules

"|0" -> "0||"
"1" -> "0|"
"0" -> ""

Symbol string
"101"

Execution
If the algorithm is applied to the above example, it will terminate after the following steps.

"101"
"0|01"
"00||1"
"00||0|"
"00|0|||"
"000|||||"
"00|||||"
"0|||||"
"|||||"

See also
 Thue (programming language)
 Formal grammar

References
 Caracciolo di Forino, A. String processing languages and generalized Markov algorithms. In Symbol manipulation languages and techniques, D. G. Bobrow (Ed.), North-Holland Publ. Co., Amsterdam, The Netherlands, 1968, pp. 191–206.
 Andrey Andreevich Markov (1903-1979) 1960. The Theory of Algorithms. American Mathematical Society Translations, series 2, 15, 1-14. (Translation from the Russian, Trudy Instituta im. Steklova 38 (1951) 176-189)

External links
 Yad Studio - Markov algorithms IDE and interpreter (Open Source)
  Markov algorithm interpreter
 Markov algorithm interpreter
 Markov algorithm interpreters at Rosetta-Code

Theory of computation
Rewriting systems
Models of computation